Soderini is an Italian surname and may refer to:

House of Soderini, a noble Florentine family. To this family belong:
Piero Soderini (1450 – 1522) Florentine statesman
Francesco Soderini (1453–1524) Florentine diplomat and religious leader
Paolo Antonio Soderini (1448 — after 1500) Florentine jurist
Giovan Vettorio Soderini (1526–1596) Italian agronomist
Eleonora degli Albizzi and Camilla Martelli were both mistresses of Grand Duke Cosimo I de' Medici and both were born to Soderini mothers. The latter married the Grand Duke.

See also
Soderini letter, document describing a disputed early voyage by Amerigo Vespucci